MGM Northfield Park (previously Hard Rock Rocksino Northfield Park) is a racino in Northfield, Ohio, U.S.A., a community near Cleveland. Northfield Park conducts more than 200 harness racing nights each year. It is owned by Vici Properties and operated by MGM Resorts International.

History 
Originally constructed in 1934, Northfield Park racetrack was originally known as Sportsman Park, with a focus on midget car racing. After 20 years as a successful car racing facility, interest began to wane and in 1956, Sportsman Park was demolished to make way for what would eventually become one of the nation's premier harness racing tracks under the leadership of Carl Milstein, a well known real estate developer and businessman. Carl Milstein purchased the track in 1972.

The tracks' top race, The Battle of Lake Erie, has featured some of the greatest pacers in history including Jaguar Spur, Gallo Blue Chip, Falcon Seelster and Riyadh. in 2007, the race was won by World Champion Maltese Artist, driven by Brett Miller in a world record time of 1:49.4 for the mile.

In early 2009, the Ohio Legislature initiated legislation that would allow each of the state's seven tracks, including Northfield, to install 2,000 slot machines  under guidelines developed by the Ohio State Racing Commission. In July 2009, slot machines were approved, and were installed at Northfield Park pending the approval of Governor John Kasich. Northfield Park's owner, Brock Milstein, contributed over $500,000 to the campaign to legalize slot machines. The racino, renamed as Hard Rock Rocksino Northfield Park, opened on December 18, 2013 with 2,300 video lottery terminals, under the management of Hard Rock International.

In 2018, MGM Growth Properties bought the property from Milstein Entertainment for $1.02 billion. Hard Rock continued to operate the property under a management agreement with the new owners. On April 1, 2019, MGM Growth's majority owner, MGM Resorts International, bought the Rocksino's operating business from MGM Growth for $275 million in stock, assumed control from Hard Rock, and rebranded the property as MGM Northfield Park. MGM Resorts would lease the property from MGM Growth for initial rent of $60 million per year.

Vici Properties acquired MGM Growth, including Northfield Park, in 2022.

The track's nickname is "The Home of the Flying Turns" and its motto "Every nineteen minutes the place goes crazy".

Trackside Lounge 
In the spring of 2008 Northfield Park constructed the Trackside Lounge. Trackside at Northfield Park is a state-of-the-art Sports Bar, featuring three-dozen flat-screen television monitors, private seating areas, full bar service and snack menu. In addition to Northfield’s full simulcast agenda, Trackside broadcasts major sporting events including Guardians, Cavaliers and Browns games, March Madness, the World Series, Super Bowl, NASCAR and more. The Trackside Barbecue features award-winning ribs, pulled pork sandwiches and more, and food from the barbecue can be brought into the Trackside Lounge, or eaten in the barbecue tent pavilion.

The RaceBook, a $600,000 companion renovation, mirrors the Trackside Lounge's design and elements, featuring hundreds of flat-screen tvs and private TV carrels or workstations. The RaceBook is the highlight of the track's simulcast area, where patrons wager on races from other tracks from around the world.

Cedar Downs 
Cedar Downs is the only off-track betting parlor in Ohio and is owned and operated by Northfield Park. Cedar Downs is located in Sandusky, Ohio at the entrance to the Cedar Point Causeway. Northfield purchased the facility in the summer of 2005. It had previously been operated by Raceway Park, a Toledo harness track.

See also
Thistledown (racecourse)

References

External links

Casinos in Ohio
Horse racing venues in Ohio
Harness racing venues in the United States
Buildings and structures in Summit County, Ohio
Sports venues in Ohio
Tourist attractions in Summit County, Ohio
1934 establishments in Ohio
MGM Resorts International
Casinos completed in 2013
Sports in Summit County, Ohio